Mount Carleton Provincial Park, established in 1970, is the largest provincial park in the Province of New Brunswick, Canada. It encompasses  in the remote highlands of north-central New Brunswick. The park is a lesser-known gem of the Atlantic Canadian wilderness. Some outdoor enthusiasts refer to it as the "Algonquin of New Brunswick."

Geography 
The park's dominant natural features include the highest peak in the Maritimes, Mount Carleton, and several large freshwater lakes (Nictau Lake, Little Nictau Lake, Bathurst Lake, and the Nepisiguit Lakes). Located at the headwaters of the Nepisiguit River and the Tobique River, the lakes offered a convenient portage route between the Nepisiguit and Saint John River watersheds. The Canadian portion of the International Appalachian Trail passes through the park. The Nepisiguit Mi'gmaq Trail, a wilderness backpacking trail which follows the Nepisguit river to Bathurst, has its western terminus at Bathurst Lake in the park.

The mountains in the park are erosional remnants of resistant igneous rocks that remained after an ancient Mesozoic peneplain surface was uplifted in the Cenozoic to form a plateau, and subsequently dissected via millions of years of erosion by wind, water and glacial ice.

Features 
Mount Carleton Provincial Park has 11 hiking trails and four main mountain peaks, each accessible by trail: Mount Carleton, 820m (2,690 ft); Mount Head, 792m (2,589 ft); Mount Sagamook, 777m (2,549 ft); and Mount Bailey, 564m (1,850 ft).

Newly renovated cabins along Nictau Lake and Bathurst Lake provide comfortable rustic wilderness experiences for any outdoor enthusiast. There are three camping areas within the park, and many family activities going on throughout the season.

History 
Mount Carleton is rich in cultural and natural history. Along the shores of Nictau Lake, First Nations artifacts have been found that date back to thousands of years. Signs are placed at the beginning of the hiking trails in Mount Carleton Provincial Park to provide a brief description of some of the human, cultural, and natural history of the area.

In 2009, the park was officially designated as a Dark Sky Preserve on behalf of Parks Canada and the Royal Astronomy Society of Canada. This designation aims to keep the area free from light pollution.

Activities 
An annual stargazing event usually takes place in late July or early August. The night sky of Mount Carleton Provincial Park is among the darkest skies in Canada.

See also
List of New Brunswick parks

References

External links

Mount Carleton Provincial Park
Protected Planet Database

Provincial parks of New Brunswick
Geography of Northumberland County, New Brunswick
Geography of Restigouche County, New Brunswick
Volcanism of New Brunswick
Tourist attractions in Northumberland County, New Brunswick
Tourist attractions in Restigouche County, New Brunswick
Dark-sky preserves in Canada